Pseudopachybrachius is a genus of dirt-colored seed bugs in the family Rhyparochromidae. There are about eight described species in Pseudopachybrachius.

Species
These eight species belong to the genus Pseudopachybrachius:
 Pseudopachybrachius basalis (Dallas, 1852)
 Pseudopachybrachius capicolus (Stal, 1874)
 Pseudopachybrachius concepcioni Zheng & Slater, 1984
 Pseudopachybrachius guttus (Dallas, 1852)
 Pseudopachybrachius nesovinctus Ashlock, 1972
 Pseudopachybrachius reductus (Walker, 1872)
 Pseudopachybrachius undulatus (Dohrn, 1860)
 Pseudopachybrachius vinctus (Say, 1831)

References

External links

 

Rhyparochromidae
Articles created by Qbugbot